Devario anomalus is a freshwater fish endemic to Bangladesh.

References

Fish of Bangladesh
Cyprinid fish of Asia
Fish described in 2009
Devario